William McComas Byron Jr. (born November 29, 1997) is an American professional stock car racing driver. He competes full-time in the NASCAR Cup Series, driving the No. 24 Chevrolet Camaro ZL1 for Hendrick Motorsports, part-time in the NASCAR Xfinity Series, driving the No. 17 Chevrolet Camaro for Hendrick Motorsports, and part-time in the NASCAR Craftsman Truck Series, driving the No. 51 Chevrolet Silverado for Kyle Busch Motorsports. He won the 2015 NASCAR K&N Pro Series East Championship and the Sunoco Rookie of the Year award in the 2016 NASCAR Camping World Truck Series season. The following season he won both the 2017 NASCAR Xfinity Series Championship and 2017 Sunoco Rookie of the Year. Byron also won the 2018 MENCS Sunoco Rookie of the Year award.

Racing career

Beginnings
Byron became interested in racing when he was six years old after seeing a stock car race on television, later attending a race at Martinsville Speedway in 2006. He began racing on the iRacing simulator as a teenager with over 100 wins and 298 top fives in online competition.

In 2012, he and his father explored how Byron could start racing offline, in real cars. He started racing Legends that year at the age of 15, relatively late for modern drivers. That year he won 33 races and became the Legend Car Young Lions Division champion.

For 2014, Byron signed with JR Motorsports late model program, in addition to continuing Legends competition. Byron competed in the No. 9 Liberty University Chevrolet at Hickory Motor Speedway in North Carolina for JRM. Byron scored a single victory and 11 top-five finishes, finishing second in points to teammate Josh Berry at Hickory.

K&N Pro Series

Byron was signed to drive in the NASCAR K&N Pro Series East for 2015 by HScott Motorsports with Justin Marks, with sponsorship from Liberty University. Byron also continued racing late models for JR Motorsports. In his debut K&N East in February at New Smyrna Speedway, Byron finished 7th. Byron won the second race of the season at Greenville-Pickens Speedway after starting second and leading all 152 laps (two laps past the scheduled distance). Byron made his ARCA Racing Series debut at Lucas Oil Raceway in July, driving the No. 55 Liberty University Toyota Camry for Venturini Motorsports. Byron finished second after leading 120 laps. He scored four K&N East wins en route to winning the series championship. Byron and his team also competed in the 2015 K&N Pro Series West races at Sonoma and Phoenix, finishing fifth and second respectively.

Camping World Truck Series
On October 29, 2015, Kyle Busch Motorsports announced that Byron would run a full-time schedule in the team's No. 9 Toyota Tundra in the NASCAR Camping World Truck Series during the 2016 season. To prepare him for the run, KBM fielded the No. 9 for him in the 2015 Lucas Oil 150 at Phoenix International Raceway. Byron started the 2016 season on a low note crashing on the final lap at Daytona to finish 13th, and finishing 32nd at Atlanta after blowing an engine. Later, Byron would get his first top 3 and 10 in the Truck Series after finishing a strong 3rd at Martinsville. Byron won his first Truck Series race at Kansas in May, after avoiding Ben Rhodes and Johnny Sauter's crash on the last lap of the race, and took his second race win in Texas in June. He won the next race at Iowa, finished 17th at Gateway due to a crash, and won yet again at Kentucky, propelling him to first in points. He followed that up with his fifth win of the season at Pocono Raceway, breaking the Camping World Truck Series record for most wins by a rookie. The previous mark was held by Kurt Busch during the 2000 season with four wins.

During the playoffs, Byron won the first race of the Round of 8 at New Hampshire but suffered an engine failure at the last race of the Round of 6 at Phoenix, which cost him the chance to join the Championship 4. With a win at the final race at Homestead, he placed fifth in the overall standings, with a total of seven wins, eleven top 5s, and 16 top 10s in 23 races. In addition to clinching the owners' championship for the No. 9 team, Byron was named Rookie of the Year.

Byron returned to the Truck Series in June 2021, driving the No. 27 for Rackley WAR at Nashville Superspeedway.

On April 7, 2022, Byron drove for Spire Motorsports, giving the team its first Truck Series win at Martinsville.

Xfinity Series

On August 18, 2016, Byron and Hendrick Motorsports announced they had signed a multi-year driver agreement, with Byron running full-time in the NASCAR Xfinity Series driving the No. 9 Chevrolet Camaro SS for JR Motorsports in 2017. Byron finished 2nd at Michigan, just losing out to Denny Hamlin. One week later, Byron won his first career race at Iowa after Christopher Bell wrecked late in the race, battling for a win with Ryan Sieg, who eventually placed second. He ended up winning again the week later in an overtime finish at Daytona. Byron also won at Indianapolis Motor Speedway for the third Xfinity victory of his career; he would add a fourth win when the series visited Phoenix for the penultimate race of the season. The Phoenix win also placed Byron among the four drivers eligible to race for the series championship at Homestead-Miami Speedway. At the final race in Homestead, Byron held off his Championship 4 teammate Elliott Sadler in the final laps to win the 2017 NASCAR Xfinity Series Championship. 

Byron returned to Xfinity series for the first time since 2017. He drove the JR Motorsports No. 88 to a second-place finish at Texas and 26th at New Hampshire. Driving the Hendrick Motorsports No. 17 at Watkins Glen, Byron fiercely battled Ty Gibbs for the lead throughout most of the race until they both spun off-course during the final restart, resulting in Byron finishing 25th.

Cup Series

On August 9, 2017, Hendrick Motorsports announced Byron would be the new replacement for Kasey Kahne in the No. 5 car in 2018, while continuing current sponsorship with Axalta Coating Systems and Liberty University. Twenty days later, however, HMS announced Byron would instead drive the No. 24, while Chase Elliott moved to the rebranded No. 9 car. Byron inherited Kahne's No. 5 team, including crew chief Darian Grubb. On October 10, 2018, Hendrick Motorsports announced that Grubb will move on to a technical director position while Chad Knaus takes over crew chief duties for Byron and the No. 24 in 2019. Byron clinched Rookie of the Year honors after the penultimate race of the year at ISM Raceway, becoming the second driver next to Erik Jones to win Rookie of the Year in consecutive seasons in each of the three national series

Byron started the 2019 season on a strong note as he won the Daytona 500 pole, heading a Hendrick lockout of the first two rows. His consistency in the regular season landed him in the playoffs for the first time in his career. Byron finished sixth at the Charlotte Roval to advance to the Round of 12. He was eliminated in the Round of 12 after the Kansas race. 

In Duel 2 of the 2020 Bluegreen Vacations Duels, Byron scored the win to start fourth in the Daytona 500, but ultimately he would finish 40th in the race. He scored his first career Cup victory at the track in August at the Coke Zero Sugar 400, avoiding various wrecks and winning in overtime to advance to the playoffs. Byron, however, was eliminated following the first round at Bristol after finishing 38th due to an accident. Earlier in 2020, Byron signed an extension to his contract with Hendrick Motorsports through the 2022 Season.

Byron started the 2021 season by qualifying second at the 2021 Daytona 500 while teammate Alex Bowman took the pole. After a 26th-place finish at the Daytona 500 and a 33rd-place finish in Daytona International Speedway's infield road course, Byron won the third race of the season at Homestead-Miami Speedway, leading 101 of the final 112 laps. Byron's victory started an eleven-race Top-10 streak, with Top 5 finishes at Martinsville, Talladega, Darlington and Dover. Byron's Top-10 streak would come at an end at the Circuit of the Americas road course, as he would finish 11th. Byron rebounded in the following race with a Top-5 finish at Charlotte in the Coca-Cola 600, finishing fourth. After finishing 35th at Sonoma Raceway following a wreck, Byron rebounded with back-to-back third-place finishes at Nashville Superspeedway and the first of a double-header at Pocono Raceway. Byron struggled the next four races finishing outside the Top 10, but would finish sixth at the 2021 Go Bowling at The Glen. During the playoffs, Byron made it to the Round of 12, but struggled with poor finishes at Las Vegas and Talladega. Following the Charlotte Roval race, he was eliminated from the Round of 8. He finished the season with a career-high 10th in the points standings.

During the 2022 season, Byron started with two DNFs at the 2022 Daytona 500 and Fontana, but rebounded with wins at Atlanta and Martinsville. On May 5, Byron received a contract extension to remain at Hendrick Motorsports through 2025. At Darlington, Byron was close to scoring his third win when Joey Logano punted him to the wall with two laps to go. On July 28, three days prior to the Indianapolis road race, the generator of the No. 24's hauler caught fire. The car was not damaged by the blaze. At the Texas playoff race, Byron spun Denny Hamlin towards the infield grass during a late-caution period; he was subsequently fined 50,000 and the No. 24 was docked 25 driver and owner points. On October 6, the National Motorsports Appeals Panel rescinded the points penalty and instead amended the fine to 100,000, placing Byron back to seventh in the playoff standings. Byron was eliminated following the Round of 8 after finishing eighth at Martinsville. He finished the season in a career-best sixth in the points standings.

Byron started the 2023 season with a 34th place DNF at the 2023 Daytona 500. He later scored back-to-back wins at Las Vegas and Phoenix. On March 15, the No. 24 was served an L2 penalty after unapproved hood louvers were found installed on the car during pre-race inspection at Phoenix; as a result, the team was docked 100 driver and owner points and 10 playoff points. In addition, crew chief Rudy Fugle was suspended for four races and fined 100,000.

Personal life
Byron was born the younger of two children in Charlotte, North Carolina. He attended Charlotte Country Day School while taking online classes through sponsor Liberty University, graduating in May 2016. Byron is also currently a student at Liberty University earning his college degree, majoring in business communication. Byron is an Eagle Scout.

Byron is a Christian, saying “I feel like getting into racing was God’s plan for me, so I can spread my faith through the racing garage and with race fans — that’s why it’s been so special."

He is in a relationship with Erin Blaney, the sister of fellow Cup Series driver and friend Ryan Blaney.

On May 4, 2021, Byron announced on Twitter that his mother Dana was being treated for a MALT lymphoma tumor in the left side of her brain. He revealed on July 27 that Dana was able to heal from the disease.

Motorsports career results

NASCAR
(key) (Bold – Pole position awarded by qualifying time. Italics – Pole position earned by points standings or practice time. * – Most laps led.)

Cup Series

Daytona 500

Xfinity Series

Camping World Truck Series

K&N Pro Series East

K&N Pro Series West

ARCA Racing Series
(key) (Bold – Pole position awarded by qualifying time. Italics – Pole position earned by points standings or practice time. * – Most laps led.)

 Season still in progress
 Ineligible for series points

References

External links

 
 Official profile at Hendrick Motorsports
 

1997 births
NASCAR drivers
Living people
Racing drivers from Charlotte, North Carolina
Liberty University alumni
People from Charlotte, North Carolina
ARCA Menards Series drivers
ARCA Midwest Tour drivers
Kyle Busch Motorsports drivers
JR Motorsports drivers
Hendrick Motorsports drivers
NASCAR Xfinity Series champions